Luc Portelance is the former president of the Canada Border Services Agency (CBSA). From 1979, he worked for the Royal Canadian Mounted Police (RCMP). From 1982, he worked for the RCMP Security Service in Quebec Region. From 1984 to 2009, he was a Canadian Security Intelligence Service (CSIS) officer. He was deputy director general in charge of the Counterintelligence Branch, director general for the Quebec Region, and assistant director. From 2007 to 2009, he was CSIS deputy director for operations under Jim Judd; succeeding Jack Hooper, who did not get along with Director Jim Judd. From August 2008, he was CBSA executive vice president.

Portelance was the CBSA president from November 2010 until his retirement in June 2015. In his role as president, in October 2013 he recommended that popular reality TV show Border Security: Canada's Front Line not be renewed for a third season.

Appearing at the first press conference regarding the 2006 Toronto terrorism case, Portelance was later quoted as stating "Terrorism is a dangerous ideology and a global phenomenon...Canada is not immune from this ideology."

References

March 16, 2007 statement

Year of birth missing (living people)
Living people
Canadian civil servants
Canadian police officers